is a Japanese band and solo performing name of singer-songwriter and producer Jun Tanaka. Gentouki has released 6 major singles and 5 major albums in the band's history. Most recent album Tanjoubi was released on September 21, 2016.

Members 
 is the founder, vocalist and songwriter of Gentouki. Tanaka continues Gentouki as a solo project with live support members.

Past members 

From Okayama prefecture. Bassist. (1995–2001)

From Nara prefecture. Drummer. (1995–2000)

From Hirakata, Osaka prefecture
Nicknamed Itoken. Bassist. (Official member 2001–2006)

From Nagano Prefecture. Drummer. (Live support 2000–2002. Official member 2002–2006)

Support members
 (ex Gentouki)
Bassist. (Live support 2008 – )
 (ex Quruli)
From Kawanishi, Hyogo prefecture. Drummer.
 (ex SG Honeoka)
From Osaka prefecture. Piano.
 (THE ORANGES)
From Tokyo prefecture. Guitar.

History

Early life
Jun Tanaka grew up with the influence of music his parents listened to, such as American pop music from A&M Records, The Beatles and classic Japanese pop and folk music. 
He is deeply influenced by Brazilian artists including Elis Regina, Joyce Moreno, Doris Monteiro, Tom Jobim, and João Gilberto.

Gentouki formation (1995–2000)
The band formed in Osaka 1995 under the name 'Everyday Flowers' and eventually changed the band name to Gentouki, meaning magic lantern after manga artist Oji Suzuki's Toumei Tsuushin.
Tanaka was attending university at the time and enlisted Hiroyuki Yoshida on drums and Takashi Mori on bass, with Jun Tanaka on vocals, guitar and keyboard. After a number of live shows, Gentouki completed a 6-song cassette demo tape.

Indies debut (2000–2003)
The band made their indies debut at the label CHILDISH SOUP with the mini-album Omae no Ashiato.
During this time, the band attracted interest from musicians like Keiichi Sokabe and Yoshihiko Inohara. Gentouki was considered a rival band of Kirinji.
They performed at the Udagawa-cho Rock Festival and venues across Tokyo.
In 2001, the band would release their first single Haikara. and album Minami no Hankyuu.through DAIZAWA RECORDS, with member Kenta Itou joining on bass, and officially becoming a 2-man band. 
After moving from Osaka to Tokyo in 2002, Gentouki recorded the cover of Aoi Kuruma for Spitz tribute album Ichigo Ichie Sweets for my SPITZ. Support drummer Kyosuke Sasai would also become the third official member in November 2002.
Illustrations of the band's work during this period was done by a mutual close friend.

Major debut (2003–2006)
Gentouki had their major debut in February 2003 with the single Niibiro no Kisetsu released through label Teenage Symphony. This song was featured in heavy rotation broadcasts on FM802.
September 2003 saw the release of first major album Itsumo no You ni.

On April 15, 2005, Gentouki performed their single Hajimari no Kisetsu on NHK PopJam (1993–2007) which has since become with Music Japan.
2 months later, the single Tsuioku no Rainy Day was released and was featured as the song for the Tsuioku no Rainy Road campaign, which led to an in-store live tour, and heralded the release of second major album Kanjou no Tamago in August 2005.
2006 started off with the release of mini album Romen Densha to Cheese Cake which was themed after Matsumushi street in Nishinari, Osaka, where Tanaka lived in his early twenties. The album was featured on heavy rotation in famous cheese cake shops around Osaka.

Dissolution and solo (2006–2016)
In December 2006, Itou and Sasai left the band over irreconcilable differences of the band's direction. This led Tanaka to continue the band as a solo project.
Gentouki went on to release a best-of album titled Gentou Meisaku Gekijou in February 2007.
From 2008, Tanaka started activity as a producer and arranger for popular artists like SMAP, May J., Koda Kumi, Satomi Takasugi and others.
Tanaka has continued to perform live shows under the Gentouki moniker with ex bassist Itou has rejoined Gentouki as a live support member, as well as drummer Nobuyuki Mori, a founding member of legendary band Quruli fame.

Comeback (2016–)
Gentouki provided the commercial song for retailer Marui's Sparkling Sale campaign for Winter 2016.
In Spring 2016, Tanaka announced that Gentouki would be releasing a new major album under Victor Entertainment with the album Tanjoubi released September 21, 2016.
This launched Gentouki's bilingual efforts, as the album features English translations of the song lyrics, as well as providing English on the official homepage and social media posts.

Yusuke Nakamura involvement

The 2003 Niibiro no Kisetsu single and Itsumo no You ni releases marked the involvement of illustrator Yusuke Nakamura. Being a big fan of Gentouki and being impressed by their live performance, Nakamura personally requested the band to let him do illustrations for their CDs. This resulted in Nakamura's first professional illustration job, illustrating the artwork of 2003 single Nibiiro no kisetsu. Illustrator Yusuke Nakamura is still closely related to Gentouki and has provided most of their CD artwork.
Nakamura continues to be a close friend of Tanaka and has provided the artwork for Gentouki's newest album Tanjoubi in 2016.

Discography

Singles

Albums

Unreleased
Untitled 6 song demo tape from 1995

Compilation

Produced Works
Satomi Takasugi "hand"（Composer） – From album MASCARA released May 26, 2010
Lay "Kono Ai de Aru You ni"（Composer） – From single Kono Ai de Aru You ni released June 2, 2010
Ending song of Japanese-Korean movie Cholula no Shi
SMAP "Mijikai Kami"（Composer）  – From album We are SMAP! released July 21, 2010
Miyazaki Kaoru "Bye-Bye," "Gimme Your Love"（Composer, lyricist, Arranger) From album 9 STORIES released October 10, 2012
May J. "Eternally"（Composer, Arranger – From album Brave released December 5, 2012
Asako Toki "Girls (You are so special)"（Composer・Co-Arranger – From album HEARTBREAKIN' released June 12, 2013

Produced and Arranged Work
Masaki Shigaki
Album Hummingmoon from August 2, 2008. Produced Track 1 "this song", track 9 "Tenkininaare", Track 11 Tsuki no Michi de Aimashou. 
Performed organ on track 4 "Natsu no Odoriko", guitar and tambourine on track 6 "Sully"
Miki Taramae
Single "Heartbeat" released June 10, 2009
Arranger, Instrumental programming, acoustic guitar
Koda Kumi "I Love you, SAYONARA"（Arranger） – Cover album "ETERNITY 〜Love & Songs〜" released October 13, 2010
moumoon "Happy Unbirthday"（Arranger） – From album 15 Doors released March 2, 2011
Jonathan Wong "Boku ga Iru"（Arranger） – From single Kimi wa Bara yoru Utsukushii released June 5, 2011
Tomoko Tane
Album Uh Baby Baby from October 26, 2011
 Sang chorus, keyboard and programming on track 4 "Warattete", keyboards and programming on track 7 "Tokyo wa Nukeru Youna Aozora ~Happy Birthday~"
May J. "Shiroi Kuma no You ni"（Arranger） – From cover album Summer Ballad Covers released June 19, 2013

Soundtracks
Movie Long Caravan(October 2009)
Made title song Long Caravan for EXILE MATSU.

Music videos

Performances 
April 12, 2002 – SPACE SHOWER Retsuden 13 ~Sachiyu (Happy End no Utage~ 
October 20, 2002– MINAMI WHEEL 2002
October 18, 2003– MINAMI WHEEL 2003
October 24, 2004– MINAMI WHEEL 2004
September 17, 2005– RADIO BERRY Berry Ten Live 2005
October 11, 2014– BEATRAM MUSIC FESTIVAL 2014
December 4, 2014– Gentouki One-Man Live "Tokyo Matsumushidori~2014nen Muchuu no Tabi~"

References

External links
 

Japanese musicians